A Time for Love is a 1966 compilation album by Tony Bennett made of unreleased material recorded between 1960 and 1966.

Track listing
"A Time for Love" (Johnny Mandel, Paul Francis Webster) - 3:22
"The Very Thought of You" (Ray Noble) - 4:34
"Trapped in the Web of Love" (Jeanne Burns) - 3:20
"My Funny Valentine" (Richard Rodgers, Lorenz Hart) - 3:06
"In the Wee Small Hours of the Morning" (Bob Hilliard, David Mann) - 3:17
"Yesterdays" (Jerome Kern, Otto Harbach) - 3:02
"Georgia Rose" (Jimmy Flynn, Harry Rosenthal, Alex Sullivan) - 2:54
"The Shining Sea" (Mandel, Peggy Lee) - 2:50
"Sleepy Time Gal" (Richard A. Whiting, Raymond B. Egan, Joseph R. Alden, Ange Lorenzo) - 3:46
"Touch the Earth" (Jeri Southern) - 2:10
"I Only Miss Her When I Think of Her" (Sammy Cahn, Jimmy Van Heusen) - 3:06

Personnel
Tony Bennett - vocals
Bobby Hackett Tracks 2, 8, 9 - trumpet
Urbie Green track 7 - Trombone 
Johnny Keating Track 2 - arranger, conductor
Johnny Mandel Tracks 1, 8, 11 - arranger, conductor
Ralph Burns Tracks 7, 10 - arranger, conductor
Ralph Burns Tracks 3 - arranger, conductor

References

1966 compilation albums
Tony Bennett albums
Columbia Records albums
Albums conducted by Johnny Keating
Albums arranged by Johnny Keating